

Horst Ohrloff (2 April 1917 – 9 May 1997) was a German general in the Bundeswehr. During World War II, he served as an officer in the Wehrmacht and was a recipient of the Knight's Cross of the Iron Cross of Nazi Germany.

Awards and decorations
 Knight's Cross of the Iron Cross on 27 July 1941 as Oberleutnant and chief of the 11./Panzer-Regiment 25

References

 

1917 births
1997 deaths
Bundeswehr generals
Recipients of the Knight's Cross of the Iron Cross
Major generals of the German Army
German Army officers of World War II
Panzer commanders